Gaangi is a small river of eastern Uttar Pradesh. This stream rises from village Are near Jaunpur, Uttar Pradesh and makes its way in a southeasterly direction through the clay lands along the borders of Jaunpur and Azamgarh. It forms the boundary between Karanda and Ghazipur and joins the Ganges near Mainpur.

Ghazipur district
Rivers of Uttar Pradesh
Rivers of India